Cope-Com is a Danish Amiga software developer founded in 1987 by Martin B. Pedersen and Torben B. Larsen.

History
Martin Pedersen started out in 1985 with an Amstrad computer in which he did a conversion game title called The Vikings. At the same time Torben B. Larsen was doing the graphics for the same game on the Commodore 64 and that is how the two of them met. Feeling limited with the Amstrad and its technical abilities, Martin B. Pedersen decided to take a closer look at the new Amiga 1000 computer which was about to be released. They were impressed by the better resolution, colour palette and sound sampling of the Amiga.

Game publishing
Cope-Com published two games for the Amiga: Hybris (1989, Discovery Software) and Battle Squadron (1989, Electronic Zoo). Both were vertical-scrolling shoot 'em ups. Both titles were critical successes.

On July 4, 2011, Cope-Com had converted their famed and legendary Amiga game called Battle Squadron to iOS devices titled Battle Squadron ONE and published the game through Apple App Store.

On December 14, 2011, Cope-Com released on App Store world's first 2-player split-screen shooter for iPad, called Battle Squadron ONE 2-player. The new 2-player split-screen feature enables 2 players to go head to head with or against each other on the same iPad adding twice the fun. In addition the universal iOS version of Battle Squadron ONE was upgraded from 1.0 to 2.0 also featuring world's first 2-player split-screen mode.

On April 9, 2012, Cope-Com released for Android 2.1 - 4.x on Google Play, their famed classic Amiga shooter Battle Squadron.

On November 6, 2013, Cope-Com released for AmigaOS 4.x, their famed classic Amiga shooter Battle Squadron.

On December 23, 2013, Cope-Com released for MorphOS, their famed classic Amiga shooter Battle Squadron.

References

External links 

 Cope-Com

Amiga companies